Deal or No Deal Malaysia may refer to:

Deal or No Deal Malaysia (English-language game show)
Deal or No Deal Malaysia (Mandarin-language game show)